Macrosoma amaculata is moth-like butterfly described by Malcolm J. Scoble in 1990. It belongs to the family Hedylidae.

Distribution
The species is found in the central western and northwestern Costa Rica: Guanacaste Province from 200 to 2,100 meters above sea level on both slopes of the Cordillera de Guanacaste, Tilarán and Talamanca, in the Osa Peninsula and the Valley of Talamanca.

Description
The species is sexually dimorphic.

Wings
M. amaculata has wings of greyish brown ground color. The apex of the forewing is dark brown and weakly emarginate with a notch which is present in both sexes (more pronounced in females). The edge of the apical patch is without white markings of the male whereas the female has a white patch of moderately sized close to the apex with two adjacent very small white spots. The hindwing lacks glassy patch at the base for both sexes; a dark brown color strip runs from the apex to lathe, parallel to the middle area.
The length of the forewing of male is 20 mm.
The length of the forewing of female is 22 mm.

Genitalia

Male
Following are the characteristics of the genitalia:
 The Gnathos is broad and denticulate. The medial component is very short and is not downcurved.
 Valva is subtriangular.

Antenna
The antenna is not bipectinate for both gender.

Diagnosis
This species differs from M. bahiata in lacking the dark subapical spot on the forewing, and from M. uniformis by the absence of the small glassy patch at the base of the hindwing. The shapes of the Gnathos and Valva differ between M. amaculata and other species of this genus.

References
 Macrosoma amaculata - Overview - Encyclopedia of Life.
 Catalogue of Life.
 A catalogue of the Hedylidae (Lepidoptera: Hedyloidea), with descriptions of two new species.
  An identification guide to the Hedylidae (Lepidoptera: Hedyloidea).
 Especies de Costa Rica - Macrosoma amaculata

Sources

Hedylidae
Butterflies described in 1990
Butterflies of Central America